Stambouli meaning "from Istanbul" may refer to:

Benjamin Stambouli (born 1990), French footballer 
Elettra Stamboulis (born 1969), Italian curator, professor, writer, and comic writer
Henri Stambouli (born 1961), French footballer
Mustapha Stambouli (1920–1984), Algerian nationalist leader

Surnames of Algerian origin
Surnames of Turkish origin